USS Whitman (DE-24) was an  constructed for the United States Navy during World War II. It was promptly sent off into the Pacific Ocean to protect convoys and other ships from Japanese submarines and fighter aircraft. By the end of the war, when she returned to the United States, she had accumulated four battle stars.
 
She was laid down on 7 September 1942 at the Mare Island Navy Yard, Vallejo, California, and was initially earmarked for transfer to the Royal Navy under lend-lease. However, the U.S. Navy decided to retain the ship for its own use; and she was reclassified to DE-24 on 7 January 1943. She was launched on 19 January 1943; sponsored by Mrs. Josephine P. Whitman, the widow of Lt. (jg.) Robert Scott Whitman (died 4 June 1942 during the Battle of Midway); and commissioned at Mare Island on 3 July 1943.

Namesake
Robert Scott Whitman, Jr. was born on 1 January 1916 at Johnson City, New York. He was appointed a midshipman on 24 August 1935 and graduated from the United States Naval Academy with the Class of 1939. After sea duty on the heavy cruiser  from 26 June 1939 to 1 February 1941, he then underwent heavier-than-air instruction at the Naval Air Station Pensacola, Florida. He earned his wings there and then received further instruction at the Transition Training Squadron, Pacific Fleet, before he reported to Patrol Squadron 44 (VP-44) on 4 November 1941.

He remained with VP-44 into the spring and early summer of 1942. With the reinforcement of Midway Atoll in the face of an impending Imperial Japanese Navy (IJN) attack, VP-44 was dispatched there. During the first few days of June 1942, the PBY's based at Midway flew long patrols searching for the IJN fleet. Then, on 3 June, came the first surface contact. Whitman's plane was the third to spot the IJN ships and at 09:25 radioed a report calling attention to the "main body." After sending back a second message amplifying the data contained in his report of the initial sighting, Whitman brought his plane back to Midway in accordance with instructions.

At 07:15 on 4 June his PBY-5 was again airborne; he reported that the aircraft was being "opposed by two enemy observation planes." That proved to be the last word heard from Whitman's aircraft, as the Japanese planes shot it down in flames. Records of what happened later are sketchy, but it appears that about half of the plane's crew was lost; six survivors, including the badly wounded Ensign Jack H. Camp, USNR, were picked up by a search PBY on 6 June.

World War II Pacific Theatre operations
After shakedown out of San Diego, California, and post-shakedown availability, Whitman departed San Francisco, California, on 11 September, escorting Convoy 2298, bound for the Hawaiian Islands. Nine days later, she arrived at Pearl Harbor and safely delivered her charges. She then convoyed the seaplane tender  to Canton and Phoenix Islands in early October before she was detached to return to Pearl Harbor.

Supporting the invasion of the Gilbert Islands

In November, she moved to the Central Pacific for her first major operation, the thrust against the Japanese held Gilbert Islands. With the Commander, Escort Division 10 embarked as concurrent Commander, Task Group (TG) 57.7, Whitman patrolled off the entrance to Tarawa lagoon and performed local escort missions into December 1943.

Supporting invasion of the Marshall Islands

Returning, via Funafuti in the Ellice Islands, to Hawaii, Whitman underwent engine repairs at the Pearl Harbor Navy Yard in January 1944, before she participated in the invasion and occupation of the Marshalls, escorting a group of tankers (designated as Task Unit (TU) 53.8.3) to Majuro on D plus four-day. The destroyer escort subsequently performed several convoy escort missions between Hawaii and the Marshalls and then steamed to the west coast in March for a major overhaul at the Mare Island Navy Yard. She returned to Pearl Harbor on 10 May.
 
Whitman departed the Hawaiian Islands on 27 May to escort TU 16.6.4, a Service Force unit, to the forward areas. The tanker group to which Whitman was attached fueled some of the ships of the Fleet participating in the Marianas operation that June. The destroyer escort subsequently performed local escort missions in the Marshalls before heading back to Pearl Harbor in the autumn.

A wide variety of assignments

After returning to Hawaiian waters, Whitman operated with the U.S. Pacific Fleet submarines out of Pearl Harbor from October 1944 to May 1945, providing target services to the submariners' training program. In addition, whenever a shortage of escort vessels came up, ships such as Whitman were summoned to provide a variety of services, including anti-submarine patrols and plane-guarding. While engaged in the latter on 23 February 1945, Whitman rescued Lt. (jg.) Whitman performed her service speedily and brought Taylor safely on board only five minutes after the accident occurred.
 
After that stint in Hawaiian waters, the destroyer escort was assigned to TG 96.3 in June 1945 and performed patrol and escort missions to Eniwetok, Johnston Island, Kwajalein, and Ulithi through the summer of 1945.

Post-War operations

On 10 August 1945, the day upon which the Japanese indicated a desire to surrender unconditionally to the Allies, Whitman departed Eniwetok with Convoy EU-172, bound for Ulithi. She was en route from Ulithi to Eniwetok with Convoy UE-123 when the Japanese capitulated five days later. She was at Eniwetok when the formal surrender was signed on board  in Tokyo Bay.
 
Departing Kwajalein for the last time on 14 September 1945, Whitman sailed for Pearl Harbor and arrived there on the 20th. Her stay was brief, however, for she got underway for the west coast the next day.

Post-War decommissioning
Making port at San Pedro, Los Angeles, on 27 September, Whitman was decommissioned on 1 November and struck from the Navy List on the 16th. Sold to the National Metal and Steel Co. of Terminal Island, California, and delivered on 31 January 1947, the ship was scrapped on 20 March 1948.

Awards

References

External links
 

Evarts-class destroyer escorts
World War II frigates and destroyer escorts of the United States
Ships built in Vallejo, California
1943 ships